William More was an Oxford college head in the 16th-century.

More was born in Devon and educated at Exeter College, Oxford, graduating B.A. in 1538 and M.A. in 1541. He was appointed a Fellow of Exeter in 1537. More was Principal of Hart Hall from 1544 to 1545; and Rector of Exeter College from 1546 to 1553. A priest, he held the living at Stoke Rivers.

References

Alumni of Exeter College, Oxford
Fellows of Exeter College, Oxford
Rectors of Exeter College, Oxford
16th-century English clergy
Principals of Hart Hall, Oxford
Clergy from Barnstaple